Mallee may refer to:
Mallee (habit), the habit of woody plants that grow with multiple stems from underground lignotubers

Places
Mallee (biogeographic region), a biogeographic region in southern Western Australia
Mallee (Victoria), an informally defined region of north-western Victoria, Australia
Division of Mallee, an electoral district that includes this region
Murray Mallee, a region in South Australia

Flora
Mallee Woodlands and Shrublands,  a vegetation group which occurs in semi-arid areas of southern Australia
One of several eucalyptus species, including:
Bell-fruited mallee, Eucalyptus preissiana
Blackbutt mallee, Eucalyptus zopherophloia
Blue mallee (disambiguation), multiple species
Blue Mountains mallee, Eucalyptus stricta
Blue-leaved mallee, Eucalyptus polybractea
Book-leaf mallee, Eucalyptus kruseana
Cliff mallee ash, Eucalyptus cunninghamii - a tiny and rare mallee from a high rainfall region
Darke Peak mallee, Eucalyptus cretata
Deua gum, Eucalyptus wilcoxii
Faulconbridge mallee ash, Eucalyptus burgessiana - a mallee from a high rainfall region
Forrest's mallee, Eucalyptus forrestiana
Four-winged mallee, Eucalyptus tetraptera
Kybean mallee ash, Eucalyptus kybeanensis
Lemon-flowered mallee, Eucalyptus woodwardii
Mallee wattle, Acacia montana
Mangarlowe mallee, Eucalyptus recurva
Narrow-leaved mallee, Eucalyptus angustissima
Pear-fruited mallee, Eucalyptus pyriformis
Plunkett mallee, Eucalyptus curtisii
Red-flowered mallee box, Eucalyptus lansdowneana
Round-leaved mallee, Eucalyptus orbifolia
Sand mallee, Eucalyptus eremophila
Square-fruited mallee, Eucalyptus tetraptera
Thick-leaf mallee, Eucalyptus grossa
Wabling Hill mallee, Eucalyptus argutifolia
White mallee (disambiguation), multiple species
Yellow top mallee ash, Eucalyptus luehmanniana - a mallee from a high rainfall region

Fauna
Malleefowl, a bird that lives in mallee scrub
Mallee dragon, a species of lizard that lives in mallee scrub

People
John Mallee, American baseball coach

Other
Mallee Highway, a highway that runs from Tailem Bend, South Australia to Piangil, Victoria

See also
Malle, a municipality in the Belgian province of Antwerp
Mali (disambiguation)
Malli (disambiguation)
Molly (disambiguation)